James McInerney may refer to:

 James McInerney (hurler), Irish hurler
 James McInerney (Australian politician) (1844–1912), member of the New South Wales Legislative Council
 James P. McInerney (1859–1912), Canadian politician in the Legislative Assembly of New Brunswick
 James O. McInerney (born 1969), Irish-born microbiologist, computational evolutionary biologist and professor
 James J. McInerney, American lawyer, judge, and politician from New York